Aaron River Reservoir is a  reservoir mostly in Cohasset, Massachusetts, with small stretches extending into Hingham and Scituate. The outflow of the pond is Aaron River. Most of the reservoir is in the eastern side of Wompatuck State Park. The village of Beechwood lies to the east of the reservoir. The reservoir is a Class A water supply source used as a backup source for the Town of Cohasset. The water quality is impaired due to mercury contamination, although the source of the mercury is unknown.

External links
Environmental Protection Agency
South Shore Coastal Watersheds - Lake Assessments

Reservoirs in Massachusetts
Lakes of Norfolk County, Massachusetts
Buildings and structures in Norfolk County, Massachusetts
Protected areas of Norfolk County, Massachusetts
Cohasset, Massachusetts